Manuel "Manny" Matos (born May 9, 1953) is a retired American soccer player who played professionally in the North American Soccer League and Major Indoor Soccer League.

Matos graduated from Mineola High School where he was the 1970 Nassau County Soccer Player of the Year. He attended Adelphi University, where he played on the school's 1974 NCAA Men's Division II Soccer Championship team. He is a member of the school's Athletic Hall of Fame. In 1975, the Seattle Sounders selected Matos with the first pick of the North American Soccer League draft. He signed with the Sounders in February 1975, but did not report to the team until after he graduated from Adelphi in the spring. Matos spent most of his first season with the reserves before becoming a regular first team player in 1976. In 1979, he moved to the Los Angeles Skyhawks of the American Soccer League. Matos also played for the Buffalo Stallions in the Major Indoor Soccer League. After retiring from professional soccer, Matos continued to play for Portuguese Sports in the Philadelphia leagues until 1992.

In 1980 he was contracted to play with ASL expansion team the Phoenix Fire, but the team folded in pre-season.

References

External links
 Professional stats
 Seattle Sounders profile

1953 births
Living people
People from Mineola, New York
Soccer players from New York (state)
Adelphi Panthers men's soccer players
American soccer players
American Soccer League (1933–1983) players
Buffalo Stallions players
Los Angeles Skyhawks players
Major Indoor Soccer League (1978–1992) players
North American Soccer League (1968–1984) players
Seattle Sounders (1974–1983) players
Association football midfielders
Association football defenders
Sportspeople from Nassau County, New York
Phoenix Fire (soccer) players